Ribonuclease H2 subunit C is a protein that in humans is encoded by the RNASEH2C gene.
 RNase H2 is composed of a single catalytic subunit (A) and two non-catalytic subunits (B and C), and degrades the RNA of RNA:DNA hybrids. 

Mutations in this gene are a cause of Aicardi-Goutieres syndrome type 3 (AGS3).

Function

This gene encodes a ribonuclease H subunit that can cleave ribonucleotides from RNA:DNA duplexes. Mutations in this gene cause Aicardi-Goutieres syndrome-3, a disease that causes severe neurologic dysfunction. A pseudogene for this gene has been identified on chromosome Y, near the sex determining region Y (SRY) gene.

References

Further reading

External links